St. Teresa High School is a private, Roman Catholic high school in Decatur, Illinois.  It is located in the Roman Catholic Diocese of Springfield in Illinois.

History 
St. Teresa was established in 1866 as Academy of St. Teresa by the Sisters of the Holy Names of Jesus and Mary. In 1868 the Ursuline Sisters took over the responsibility of operating the school. St. Teresa was originally located on the 400 block of East Eldorado Street, until 1913, when it was moved to its current location and designated as an all-girls boarding school.

In 1930, due to increases in student enrollment, the Ursuline Sisters petitioned Bishop Griffin for an expansion of the academy. Bishop Griffin fulfilled their request, and in return the nuns were asked to build a co-ed building. After the transition into a co-educational institution, the school was renamed as St. Teresa High School and Sister Loretto Boland was appointed as the first principal. In 1955, as enrollment further increased, eight classrooms and a gymnasium were built and dedicated to Bishop O'Connor

In 1996, the Ursuline Sisters withdrew their sponsorship of the school and a not-for-profit corporation was formed to assume ownership and control of St. Teresa High School.

In 2015, a new athletic wing was built, containing new locker rooms and an exercise/weight lifting room. Its construction was possible by donations and had its first use in the 2015-2016 school year.

Starting in 2016, St. Teresa launched its "Sustain the Future" Campaign, which aims to raise $10.5 million, of which over $7 million has been raised.

In 2022, a new football and track complex was constructed, with a new synthetic turf football field, and the addition of a track, which the school did not have before. The project budget was $4.25 million.

Approach 
St. Teresa High School requires that each student earn a total of twenty-six credits (defined as one year of coursework) to graduate, including four from theology and English and three from mathematics and science. Other required courses include consumer education, computer concepts, and health. St. Teresa High School also requires ten service hours to the community per school year, and students must pass the Illinois and U.S. Constitution Tests. Many    Honors courses are available to students in math, chemistry, English, biology, anatomy, and physics. Several AP classes are also available: Calculus AB and BC, Computer Science, Chemistry, English Literature and Composition, Physics, and US History.  Seventh and eighth graders from the three Catholic schools in the area (Holy Family, St. Patrick, and Our Lady of Lourdes) can take advanced math and science on campus.

95% of students take part in extracurricular activities or athletics (listed below), including Student Council, Scholastic Bowl, WYSE (Worldwide Youth in Science and Engineering), FBLA (Future Business Leaders of America), National Honor Society, Drama (with two major productions each school year), Art, Band, and Chorus. Students also take part in the various clubs formed at the school, such as Art Club, Debate Club, International Club, Juggling club, and Serviam club (named after the school motto).

Campus
The current campus is one building in three parts. The science wing, which also includes the music room, chapel, and multipurpose room, is on the south side. A glass hallway separates it from the main building, which contains the majority of the classrooms and offices. The athletic wing, including the Joe Venturi gymnasium, locker rooms, weight room, and a few classrooms, is on the north side. To the east of the school are the football field, (doubling as a soccer pitch), press box, and baseball diamond. The softball diamond is to the south of the school. Students must remain on campus throughout the school day.

Athletics 
Depending upon the sport, St. Teresa competes in IHSA Class 1A or 2A (sometimes styled as A or AA) and always competes in the IHSA Central Illinois Conference. The school offers football and baseball for boys, volleyball, softball, and cheerleading for girls, and cross country, tennis, track and field, basketball, soccer, bass fishing and golf for both.

IHSA State Finishes

Alumni
Del Unser, Former MLB player (Washington Senators, Cleveland Indians, Philadelphia Phillies, New York Mets, Montreal Expos)
 Nathan H. Lents, scientist and author

External links
 School website

References

Buildings and structures in Decatur, Illinois
Educational institutions established in 1866
Roman Catholic Diocese of Springfield in Illinois
Catholic secondary schools in Illinois
Schools in Macon County, Illinois
1866 establishments in Illinois